Oyashio refers to the Oyashio Current, an ocean current.

It may also refer to one of the following Japanese warships:
 Japanese destroyer Oyashio, a Kagerō-class destroyer commissioned in 1940
 JDS Oyashio (SS-511), a submarine commissioned in 1960
 , a class of Japanese submarines
 JS Oyashio, an Oyashio-class submarine commissioned in 1998